FCMB may refer to:

 First City Monument Bank, Nigerian bank
 FC Montceau Bourgogne, French football club